The following are the national records in athletics in French Polynesia maintained by French Polynesian's national athletics federation: Fédération d'Athlétisme de Polynésie Française (FAPF).

Outdoor

Key to tables:

+ = en route to a longer distance

ht = hand timing

# = not ratified by federation

y = denotes one mile

Men

†: Transferred allegiance to France (not eligible for Oceania competitions)

Women

Indoor

Men

Women

References

External links
 FAPF web site

French Polynesia
records
Athletics